Paxillus leachi is a species of beetle in the family Passalidae. It is found in Brazil.

References

Passalidae
Beetles described in 1819